Swindon Mechanics' Institute is a Grade II* listed building in Swindon, Wiltshire. It is located in the railway village area, which is today part of a conservation area. The Swindon Mechanics' Institute served workers from the Swindon Railway Works.

History

Paid for via subscription by the Great Western Railway workers based at Swindon Railway Works, the building was designed and constructed by Edward Roberts and completed in 1855. It contained a lending library and provided health services to workers. It was enlarged in 1892-93 to a design by Brightwen Binyon, after which the committee opened up its health services to other local workers. Nye Bevan, mastermind of the NHS later said: 
After the Institute closed in 1986, and after succumbing to both vandals and arsonists, it was saved from demolition by the council. In 2003 the building was acquired by Forefront Estates, who have been served with an urgent works notice by the Borough of Swindon.

References

Buildings and structures in Swindon
Grade II* listed buildings in Wiltshire